The following is an alphabetical list of articles related to the state of Iowa.

0–9 

.ia.us – Internet second-level domain for the state of Iowa
34th Infantry Division (United States)
35th Iowa Volunteer Infantry Regiment

A
Adjacent states:

Agriculture in Iowa
Airports in Iowa
Amusement parks in Iowa
Animal Rescue League of Iowa
Aquaria in Iowa
commons:Category:Aquaria in Iowa
Arboreta in Iowa
commons:Category:Arboreta in Iowa
Archaeology of Iowa
:Category:Archaeological sites in Iowa
commons:Category:Archaeological sites in Iowa
Architecture of Iowa
Area codes in Iowa
Art museums and galleries in Iowa
commons:Category:Art museums and galleries in Iowa
Astronomical observatories in Iowa
commons:Category:Astronomical observatories in Iowa
Auto trails in Iowa

B
Birds of Iowa
Black Hawk War
Botanical gardens in Iowa
commons:Category:Botanical gardens in Iowa
Buildings and structures in Iowa
commons:Category:Buildings and structures in Iowa
Burlington, Iowa, capital of Wisconsin Territory 1837–1838, capital of Iowa Territory 1838-1841

C

Capital of the State of Iowa
Casinos in Iowa
Caves of Iowa
commons:Category:Caves of Iowa
Census statistical areas of Iowa
Cities in Iowa
commons:Category:Cities in Iowa
Climate of Iowa
Climate change in Iowa
Colleges and universities in Iowa
commons:Category:Universities and colleges in Iowa
Communications in Iowa
commons:Category:Communications in Iowa

Companies in Iowa
Congressional districts of Iowa
Convention centers in Iowa
commons:Category:Convention centers in Iowa
Counties of the State of Iowa
commons:Category:Counties in Iowa
Culture of Iowa
commons:Category:Iowa culture

D
Demographics of Iowa
Des Moines, Iowa, state capital since 1857

E
Economy of Iowa
:Category:Economy of Iowa
commons:Category:Economy of Iowa
Education in Iowa
:Category:Education in Iowa
commons:Category:Education in Iowa
Elections in the state of Iowa
:Category:Iowa elections
commons:Category:Iowa elections
Environment of Iowa
commons:Category:Environment of Iowa

F

Festivals in Iowa
commons:Category:Festivals in Iowa
Flag of the state of Iowa

G

Geography of Iowa
:Category:Geography of Iowa
commons:Category:Geography of Iowa
Geology of Iowa
:Category:Geology of Iowa
commons:Category:Geology of Iowa
Ghost towns in Iowa
:Category:Ghost towns in Iowa
commons:Category:Ghost towns in Iowa
Government of the state of Iowa  website
:Category:Government of Iowa
commons:Category:Government of Iowa
Governor of the State of Iowa
List of governors of Iowa
Great Seal of the State of Iowa

H
Heritage railroads in Iowa
commons:Category:Heritage railroads in Iowa
High schools of Iowa
Higher education in Iowa
Highway routes in Iowa
Hiking trails in Iowa
commons:Category:Hiking trails in Iowa
History of Iowa
Historical outline of Iowa
:Category:History of Iowa
commons:Category:History of Iowa
National Register of Historic Places listings in Iowa
List of National Historic Landmarks in Iowa
Honey War
Hospitals in Iowa
House of Representatives of the State of Iowa

I
IA – United States Postal Service postal code for the state of Iowa
Images of Iowa
commons:Category:Iowa
Interstate highway routes in Iowa
Invasion Iowa
Iowa  website
:Category:Iowa
commons:Category:Iowa
commons:Category:Maps of Iowa
Iowa Animal Industry Bureau
Iowa Army Ammunition Plant
Iowa Air National Guard
Iowa Army National Guard
Iowa Biennial
Iowa City, Iowa, territorial and state capital 1841-1857
Iowa Communications Network
Iowa Employer Benefits Study
Iowa Farmer Today
Iowa Interstate Railroad
Iowa Nation (Native American)
Iowa Old Capitol Building
Iowa Sports Foundation
Iowa State Capitol
commons:Category:Iowa State Capitol
Iowa State Patrol
Iowa Territory
Iowan erosion surface
Islands in Iowa

J

K

L
Lakes of Iowa
commons:Category:Lakes of Iowa
Landmarks in Iowa
commons:Category:Landmarks in Iowa
Lieutenant Governor of the State of Iowa
Lists related to the state of Iowa:
List of airports in Iowa
List of birds of Iowa
List of census statistical areas in Iowa
List of cities in Iowa
List of colleges and universities in Iowa
List of United States congressional districts in Iowa
List of counties in Iowa
List of dams and reservoirs in Iowa
List of ghost towns in Iowa
List of governors of Iowa
List of high schools in Iowa
List of highway routes in Iowa
List of hospitals in Iowa
List of Interstate highway routes in Iowa
List of islands in Iowa
List of lakes in Iowa
List of law enforcement agencies in Iowa
List of museums in Iowa
List of National Historic Landmarks in Iowa
List of newspapers in Iowa
List of people from Iowa
List of power stations in Iowa
List of radio stations in Iowa
List of railroads in Iowa
List of Registered Historic Places in Iowa
List of rivers of Iowa
List of school districts in Iowa
List of sports teams from Iowa
List of state forests in Iowa
List of state parks in Iowa
List of state preserves in Iowa
List of state prisons in Iowa
List of symbols of the State of Iowa
List of telephone area codes in Iowa
List of television stations in Iowa
List of United States congressional delegations from Iowa
List of United States congressional districts in Iowa
List of United States representatives from Iowa
List of United States senators from Iowa
List of U.S. highway routes in Iowa
Louisiana Purchase of 1803

M
Maps of Iowa
commons:Category:Maps of Iowa
Mass media in Iowa
Miss Iowa
Mississippi River
Missouri River
Mormon Trail
Museums in Iowa
:Category:Museums in Iowa
commons:Category:Museums in Iowa
Music of Iowa
commons:Category:Music of Iowa
:Category:Musical groups from Iowa
:Category:Musicians from Iowa

N
Natural gas pipelines in Iowa
Natural history of Iowa
commons:Category:Natural history of Iowa
Newspapers of Iowa

O

P
People from Iowa
:Category:People from Iowa
commons:Category:People from Iowa
:Category:People by city in Iowa
:Category:People by county in Iowa
:Category:People from Iowa by occupation
Politics of Iowa
commons:Category:Politics of Iowa
 Pookey Bleum
Portal:Iowa
Prehistory of Iowa
Protected areas of Iowa
commons:Category:Protected areas of Iowa

Q
Quad Cities

R
Radio stations in Iowa
RAGBRAI
Railroads in Iowa
Registered historic places in Iowa
commons:Category:Registered Historic Places in Iowa
Religion in Iowa
:Category:Religion in Iowa
commons:Category:Religion in Iowa
Rivers of Iowa
commons:Category:Rivers of Iowa

S
School districts of Iowa
Scouting in Iowa
Senate of the State of Iowa
Settlements in Iowa
Cities in Iowa
Towns in Iowa
Townships in Iowa
Census Designated Places in Iowa
Other unincorporated communities in Iowa
List of ghost towns in Iowa
Solar power in Iowa
Sports in Iowa
Sports teams from Iowa
:Category:Sports in Iowa
commons:Category:Sports in Iowa
:Category:Sports venues in Iowa
commons:Category:Sports venues in Iowa
State Capitol of Iowa
State of Iowa  website
Constitution of the State of Iowa
Government of the State of Iowa
:Category:Government of Iowa
commons:Category:Government of Iowa
Executive branch of the government of the State of Iowa
Governor of the State of Iowa
Legislative branch of the government of the State of Iowa
General Assembly of the State of Iowa
Senate of the State of Iowa
House of Representatives of the State of Iowa
Judicial branch of the government of the State of Iowa
Supreme Court of the State of Iowa
Iowa District Courts
State parks of Iowa
commons:Category:State parks of Iowa
State prisons of Iowa
Structures in Iowa
commons:Category:Buildings and structures in Iowa
Supreme Court of the State of Iowa
Symbols of the State of Iowa
:Category:Symbols of Iowa
commons:Category:Symbols of Iowa

T
Telecommunications in Iowa
commons:Category:Communications in Iowa
Telephone area codes in Iowa
Television shows set in Iowa
Television stations in Iowa
Theatres in Iowa
commons:Category:Theatres in Iowa
Territory of Iowa, 1838–1846
Territory of Michigan, 1805-(1834–1836)-1837
Territory of Louisiana, 1805–1812
Territory of Missouri, 1812–1821
Territory of Wisconsin, (1836–1838)-1848
Tourism in Iowa  website
commons:Category:Tourism in Iowa
Transportation in Iowa
:Category:Transportation in Iowa
commons:Category:Transport in Iowa

U
United States of America
States of the United States of America
United States census statistical areas of Iowa
United States congressional delegations from Iowa
United States congressional districts in Iowa
United States Court of Appeals for the Eighth Circuit
United States District Court for the Northern District of Iowa
United States District Court for the Southern District of Iowa
United States representatives from Iowa
United States senators from Iowa
Universities and colleges in Iowa
commons:Category:Universities and colleges in Iowa
U.S. highway routes in Iowa
US-IA – ISO 3166-2:US region code for the State of Iowa

V

W
Water parks in Iowa
Wikimedia
Wikimedia Commons:Category:Iowa
commons:Category:Maps of Iowa
Wikinews:Category:Iowa
Wikinews:Portal:Iowa
Wikipedia Category:Iowa
Wikipedia Portal:Iowa
Wikipedia:WikiProject Iowa
:Category:WikiProject Iowa
Wind power in Iowa

X

Y

Z
Zoos in Iowa
commons:Category:Zoos in Iowa

See also

Topic overview:
Iowa
Outline of Iowa

Index
 
Iowa